Christian Alfred Sidor is an American vertebrate paleontologist. He is currently a Professor in the Department of Biology, University of Washington in Seattle, as well as Curator of Vertebrate Paleontology and Associate Director for Research and Collections at the Burke Museum of Natural History and Culture. His research focuses on Permian and Triassic tetrapod evolution, especially on therapsids.

Academic and professional background 
Sidor received a B.S. (with honors) in biology from Trinity College in 1994. He went on to pursue his graduate studies at the University of Chicago, completing his M.S. in 1996 and his Ph.D. in 2000 under the supervision of James Hopson. Sidor won the Romer Prize in 2001 for his doctoral work, a competitive annual award at the Society of Vertebrate Paleontology annual meeting for the best predoctoral student oral presentation. Following his dissertation, Sidor held a postdoctoral fellowship at the National Museum of Natural History (2001) before becoming an Assistant Professor in Anatomy at the New York College of Osteopathic Medicine. He held that position until 2005, when he took up a position as an Assistant Professor in Biology at the University of Washington. Presently, he is a full Professor in Biology at the University of Washington, as well as a Curator of Vertebrate Paleontology and Associate Director for Research and Collections at the affiliated Burke Museum. He is a research associate at the Field Museum of Natural History, National Museum of Natural History, and Evolutionary Studies Institute (University of the Witwatersrand).

Academic contributions 
Sidor is best known for his work on therapsid synapsids; the title of his dissertation was "Evolutionary trends and relationships within the Synapsida." However, Sidor has been involved with research on a diverse array of other Paleozoic and Mesozoic tetrapod clades, including temnospondyl amphibians; captorhinid reptiles; pseudosuchian archosaurs; and avemetatarsalian archosaurs, encompassing a wide-ranging research program focusing on descriptive anatomy, taxonomy and phylogenetics, histology and pathology, trends in biogeography, and responses of tetrapods to major climatic perturbations. Sidor has extensive experience collecting and researching fossils from historically less well-sampled geographic regions, including Niger, Tanzania, Zambia, and Antarctica. Previously he was a member of the editorial board of the Journal of Vertebrate Paleontology (2005-2010).

Below is a list of new taxa that Sidor has contributed to naming:

References

External links
 "Toothy 'Crocamander' Was Top Triassic Predator", the Discovery Channel discusses one of the finds of Sidor's team

American paleontologists
People associated with the American Museum of Natural History
People associated with the Field Museum of Natural History
University of Washington faculty
Year of birth missing (living people)
Living people